is a 2009 Japanese drama film directed by Satoki Kemmochi and stars Somegoro Ichikawa and Younha, and a soundtrack produced by Zentaro Watanabe.

Plot

Cast 
 Somegoro Ichikawa as Shigeru Matsumoto
 Younha as Choi So-ra
 Naoto Takenaka as Koji Jindo
 Jeon Mi-seon as Choi So-ra's mother
 Yang Jin-woo as Lee Hyun-joo

References

External links 
 
 On Next Sunday at the Japanese Film Database

2009 films
2000s Japanese-language films
Zainichi Korean culture
2000s Japanese films